Seyed Mahmood Hosseini (born December 1, 1954) is an Iranian politician and former governor of provinces of Sistan va Balouchestan and Isfahan, Iran. He is assumed a member of reformist party and active member of BARAN Foundation founded by president Mohammad Khatami. He was the Director of Human resources in Iranian National gas company. He retired in 2017.

Early life, education, and family 
Hosseini was born and raised in Khorasgan, Isfahan on December 1, 1954 and studied physics, holding a Bachelor and Master Degree from Isfahan University.

Local and national politics 
During president Ahmadinejad he tried for 2008 Iran parliamentary election and later in 2011 for city of Isfahan council election as one of the reformist candidates from Isfahan, but disqualified by the Council of Guardians.
During the protests about the 2009 Iran presidential election, Seyed Mahmood Hosseini signed an open letter to the top Iranian Shia clerics prepared by Mohammad Khatami, Mir Hossein Mousavi, Mehdi Karoubi and some of the renowned reformist figures, by pointing out the arrests after the election, as being the reference and support of the great nation of Iran, to remind the government about the damaging outcomes of their unlawful acts.

Governor of Isfahan 
Hosseini was appointed to Isfahan province governor on August 6, 2002 and held the position until October 8, 2005.

Semirom Riot
One of the irritating issues during Hosseini time as province governor was the unrest started on August 16, 2003 after a decision by the Isfahan Governor General's Office to incorporate Vardasht district of Semirom into the municipality of Dehaqan provoked the ire of the people of Vardasht. The people staged a demonstration to protest the decision, but the protests later turned violent. Eight people were reportedly killed in the violence, including two police officers, and some 150 were injured.
Later Hosseini in an interview with Shargh newspaper denied any involvement in ordering to confront police with people and said the number of killed were four.

References

1954 births
Living people
Governors of Isfahan
Politicians from Isfahan
Union of Islamic Iran People Party politicians
Governors of Sistan and Baluchestan Province